Types of accidental killing include:

 Involuntary manslaughter if unlawful
 Accidental death if not due to unreasonable behavior
 Collateral damage (a euphemism) if due to imprecise or incorrect targeting during wartime